The 1935 Open Championship featured the defending open champion F. D. Amr Bey of Egypt being challenged by Jim Dear the professional champion. The first leg was held at the Bath Club on 25 November. Bey from the Bath Club won the first leg three games to two. The second leg took place at Dear's home club the Royal Automobile Club on 2 December . Bey wrapped up his third consecutive Open Championship title by clinching the second leg three games to one.

Results

First Leg

Second Leg

References

Men's British Open Squash Championships
Men's British Open Squash Championship
Men's British Open Squash Championship
Men's British Open Squash Championship
Men's British Open Squash Championship
Squash competitions in London